The Man from Hell's River, also known as simply Hell's River, is a 1922 American silent Western film starring Irving Cummings, Eva Novak, and Wallace Beery. The screenplay was written by Cummings based upon the story "God of Her People" by James Oliver Curwood, and directed by Cummings. The picture was notably the first of many (including a subsequent television series) for canine character Rin Tin Tin, who replaced a truculent wolf originally slated to appear. The movie exists and is readily available online. The Man from Hell's River was produced by Irving Cummings Productions.

Plot
As described in a film magazine, taking place in the woods of the Canadian northwest, Corporal Pierre de Barre (Cummings) loves Mabella (Novak), the foster daughter of Lopente (Klein), and she loves him. Gaspard, The Wolf (Beery), holding over Lopente knowledge of a killing for which he would be arrested, demands Mabella. Lopente forces the young woman to marry Gaspard, telling her that he would be arrested and hung otherwise. She does not tell Corporal Pierre why this happened, and he cannot fathom her reasons. Gaspard returns to seeing the women of doubtful virtue which formerly held his attentions. This irritates Pierre but he cannot do anything. The Priest tells Pierre of Mabella's story, and that she is not really Lopente's daughter. Mabella arouses Gaspard's jealousy and he sets out to kill Pierre. Sergeant McKenna (Whitson) and his deputy leave the post deserted, and Gaspard arrives and knocks Pierre down. Gaspard then flees with his wife. Pierre follows, and he and Gaspard have a fight out on the snow covered mountain. Pierre's wolf dog (Rin Tin Tin) breaks his bounds and jumps, landing on Gaspard and knocking him over the cliff. Pierre and Mabella are now free to marry.

Cast
 Irving Cummings as Pierre de Barre
 Eva Novak as Mabella
 Wallace Beery as Gaspard, The Wolf
 Frank Whitson as Sergeant McKenna
 Robert Klein as Lopente
 William Herford as The Padre
 Rin Tin Tin

References

External links

 
 

1920s English-language films
1922 films
American black-and-white films
1922 Western (genre) films
Films directed by Irving Cummings
Northern (genre) films
Rin Tin Tin
Royal Canadian Mounted Police in fiction
Films based on works by James Oliver Curwood
Silent American Western (genre) films
1920s American films